Aimwell is an unincorporated community in Catahoula Parish, Louisiana, United States. It has also been known as Debourn and Hickory Flat in its history.  The ZIP Code for Aimwell is 71401.

History
Aimwell was named for the son of Joseph Willis, a pioneer minister.

References

Unincorporated communities in Catahoula Parish, Louisiana
Unincorporated communities in Louisiana